Boulmer  is a village in Northumberland, England, on the North Sea coast east of Alnwick. It is home to RAF Boulmer. Boulmer has an independent volunteer lifeboat station.

Origin of the name
The name Boulmer, pronounced "Boomer", is a derivation of Bulemer, from the old English bulan-mere (bulls mere).

History
Boulmer was notorious for its smuggling activities, much of which was centred on the Fishing Boat Inn. In the 18th century, one of the most well-known smugglers, King of the Gypsies William Faa, lived some 35 miles away in the remote Scottish village of Kirk Yetholm. In the 18th and 19th centuries, the village was the smuggling capital of Northumberland.

A major change was the arrival of the Royal Air Force in World War 2. Otherwise, Boulmer has changed little in over 100 years and is one of the few true traditional fishing villages left on the Northumberland coast.

Today
The village consists of a row of cottages and the pub. Set within a natural haven, in a gap through an almost complete band of rock, Boulmer has no harbour.

Fishing

Traditional blue fishing cobles are hauled ashore or moored in the water. The main catch is crab, lobster and sea salmon.

Boulmer Volunteer Rescue Service
Boulmer Volunteer Rescue Service was originally funded by the Duke of Northumberland and was run by the RNLI between 1825 and 1967 when the RNLI decided to withdraw the service. Re-established in 1967 when the community decided to buy their own private boat, it is now an independent lifeboat service, but currently only operates during daylight hours, weekends and on bank holidays due to a small crew and limited sea-traffic.

Filming location
In the spring and summer of 2004, much of the filming for the ITV comedy-drama series Distant Shores was carried out at various locations along the Northumberland coast. Boulmer is featured in many scenes, including "Hildasay" Ferry and various settings depicted both inside and outside the cottages, including the beach and sand dunes, and the nearby countryside where the fictional new doctor's surgery was built.

Climate

Governance 
Boulmer is in the parliamentary constituency of Berwick-upon-Tweed.

See also
 Independent lifeboats (British Isles)

References

External links

Villages in Northumberland
Populated coastal places in Northumberland
Longhoughton